The nine-pin bowling European Championships was a nine-pin bowling competition organized by the Fédération Internationale des Quilleurs (FIQ). The first European Championships were held in 1949 in Vienna. It was an unofficial competition in which seven countries took part.

The first official ones under the name European Cup were held in 1956 in Erfurt. They were held in the biennial in the years 1956–1960, alternating with the World Championships.
The only one official European Championships were held in 1964 in Budapest, as new concept of quadrennial competition alternating with the World Championships. However, this concept was abandoned and since 1966 only the biennial World Championships have been resumed.

In 2019, in Rokycany were inaugurated the 60+ European Championships. It is currently planned for them to be held as a biennial competition since 2020.

List of championships

Medal count

List of hosts 
List of hosts by number of championships hosted.

References

 
Recurring sporting events established in 1949
European championships in nine-pin bowling